Schradera is a genus of flowering plants in the family Rubiaceae. It was described by Martin Vahl in 1797. The genus has a wide distribution area and is found from tropical America to the Malay Archipelago. It is the only genus in the tribe Schradereae.

Species

 Schradera acuminata Standl.
 Schradera acutifolia (Valeton) Puff
 Schradera andina Steyerm.
 Schradera bipedunculata Steyerm.
 Schradera blumii Dwyer & M.V.Hayden
 Schradera brevipes Steyerm.
 Schradera cacuminis Standl.
 Schradera campii Standl. ex Steyerm.
 Schradera cephalophora Griseb.
 Schradera clusiifolia (Britton & Standl.) R.O.Williams
 Schradera costaricensis Dwyer
 Schradera cuatrecasasii Standl. ex Steyerm.
 Schradera cubensis Steyerm.
 Schradera elmeri Puff
 Schradera exotica (J.F.Gmel.) Standl.
 Schradera glabriflora Steyerm.
 Schradera grandiflora Puff
 Schradera hilliifolia Steyerm.
 Schradera involucrata (Sw.) K.Schum.
 Schradera korthalsiana (Miq.) Puff
 Schradera ledermannii (Valeton) Puff
 Schradera lehmannii Standl.
 Schradera luxurians Standl. ex Steyerm.
 Schradera maguirei Steyerm.
 Schradera marahuacensis Steyerm.
 Schradera marginalis Standl.
 Schradera membranacea (King) Puff
 Schradera monantha (Merr. & L.M.Perry) Puff
 Schradera monocephala (Merr.) Puff
 Schradera montana (Korth.) Puff
 Schradera neeoides Standl. ex Steyerm.
 Schradera negrensis Suess.
 Schradera nervulosa (Stapf) Puff
 Schradera nilssonii Steyerm.
 Schradera novoguineensis (Valeton) Puff
 Schradera obtusifolia C.M.Taylor
 Schradera pentacme (Stapf) Puff
 Schradera polycephala DC.
 Schradera polysperma (Jack) Puff
 Schradera pseudonervulosa Puff
 Schradera puberula Steyerm.
 Schradera pulverulenta Steyerm.
 Schradera ramiflora (Valeton) Puff
 Schradera reticulata J.Sanchez-Gonz.
 Schradera revoluta Standl.
 Schradera rotundata Standl. ex Steyerm.
 Schradera schlechteri (Valeton) Puff
 Schradera stellata Benth.
 Schradera suaveolens (H.Karst.) Steyerm.
 Schradera subandina K.Krause
 Schradera subsessilis Steyerm.
 Schradera surinamensis Standl.
 Schradera ternata Steyerm.
 Schradera umbellata C.Presl
 Schradera yutajensis Steyerm.

References

External links
Schradera in the World Checklist of Rubiaceae

 
Rubiaceae genera
Taxa named by Martin Vahl